The  is a Japanese bus company operating local and long-distance buses in Hokkaido prefecture, Japan. The company operates routes connecting cities within Hokkaido, as well as local city and chartered bus services.

Overview
Besides providing bus services within Hokkaido Prefecture, Hokkaido Chuo Bus also operates chartered buses. Its central business is transportation within the metropolitan areas of many cities in the prefecture, including Sapporo, Asahikawa, Otaru, Iwamizawa, Ishikari, Takikawa, and Eniwa.

Business offices 

 Otaru, Head Office
 Sapporo Office (maintenance department, Sapporo division & Charter travel division)
 Otaru division
 Takikawa, Sorachi division

Major sales offices

Otaru division 

Otaru, Shin Hokkaido Chuo Bus Terminal 
Yoichi Office
Iwanai Bus Terminal
Otaru Bus Terminal

Sapporo division
Hiraoka Office
Nishioka Sales Office
Omagari Sales Office
Shiraishi Office
Sapporo-Higashi Office
 Sapporo Office
Shinkawa Office
Ishikari Office
Chitose Office
Ebetsu Sales Office
Tsukisamu Office 
Asahikawa Bus Terminal, (Asahikawa Office) 
Sapporo Bus Terminal
Sapporo Station Bus Terminal

Sorachi division
Takikawa Sales Office
Iwamizawa Office
Takikawa Bus Terminal
Iwamizawa Bus Terminal
Rumoi Bus Terminal

Highway bus routes

 Sapporo - Kitami, Abashiri
 Sapporo - Otaru
 Sapporo - Iwanai
 Sapporo - Niseko
 Sapporo - Tomakomai
 Sapporo - Muroran
 Sapporo - Kutchan
 Sapporo - Obihiro
 Sapporo - Kushiro
 Sapporo - Nayoro
 Sapporo - Chitose Airport
 Sapporo - Kuriyama
 Sapporo - Yubari
 Sapporo - Asahikawa, Mombetsu
 Sapporo - Engaru
 Sapporo - Rumoi, Fukagawa
 Sapporo - Biei
 Sapporo - Iwamizawa, Mikasa
 Sapporo - Hakodate

External links

 

Bus companies of Japan
Companies based in Hokkaido
Transport in Otaru
Transport in Sapporo